Jack Daye (born 9 September 1992), better known by the stage name Art Simone, is an Australian drag performer best known for finishing as a runner-up on the first season of RuPaul's Drag Race Down Under.

Career
Art Simone competed on the first season of RuPaul's Drag Race Down Under. During Snatch Game, she impersonated Bindi Irwin, an impersonation for which she was eliminated second in 9th place in a shock elimination. However, she returned to the competition two episodes later and ultimately place as a runner-up.

Previously, she starred in the WOW Presents Plus series Highway to Heel. She has also been named Drag Performer of the Year and earned the title Queen of Australia. Art Simone has also appeared on The Bachelor Australia and in multiple commercials.

Personal life
Daye is from Melbourne and lives in Geelong, as of 2021.

Filmography

Television

References

External links

 
 Art Simone at IMDb

1992 births
Living people
Australian drag queens
RuPaul's Drag Race Down Under contestants